This is a list of all cricketers who have played first-class cricket matches for Attock Group cricket team. The team played four first-class matches in 2006. Seasons given are first and last seasons; the player did not necessarily play in all the intervening seasons.

Players
 Abdul Mannan, 2006/07
 Alamgir Khan, 2006/07
 Ameer Khan, 2006/07
 Asim Iqbal Butt, 2006/07
 Mohammad Asim Butt, 2006/07
 Babar Naeem, 2006/07
 Imran Ali, 2006/07
 Khurram Shehzad, 2006/07
 Manzoor Ali, 2006/07
 Mohammad Ibrahim, 2006/07
 Mohammad Rameez, 2006/07
 Nauman Aman, 2006/07
 Pervez Aziz, 2006/07
 Saad Altaf, 2006/07
 Sajid Mahmood, 2006/07
 Sohail Tanvir, 2006/07
 Tariq Mahmood, 2006/07
 Zohaib Ahmed, 2006/07

References

Attock Group cricketers